= Chhibaiyan =

Village in Uttar Pradesh, India

Chhibaiya is a large village in Prayagraj district, Uttar Pradesh, India. Chhibaiya is large and populated village near shrine Aindri devi shakteepeeth.
